Justice Miles may refer to:

George Miles (Michigan jurist) (1789–1850), associate justice of the Michigan Supreme Court
Jeffrey Miles (1935–2019), chief justice of the Australian Capital Territory
Willard W. Miles, associate justice of the Vermont Supreme Court